Route 14 is a two-lane, uncontrolled-access, secondary highway in western Prince Edward Island. The route is entirely in Prince County and generally parallels Route 2 as it heads toward the North Cape. Its southern terminus is at Route 2 in Coleman and its northern terminus is at Route 2 in Tignish.

Route description 

The route begins at its southern terminus and heads southwest. It then reaches Brae and heads westward. It turns left in Glenwood and continues west until West Point, where it turns north. In West Cape, it curves to the northeast and continues that way until it reaches Nail Pond, where it curves to the south and ends at its northern terminus.

Junction list

References 

014
014